Sanford Arms is an American sitcom television series produced as a spin-off and continuation of Sanford and Son, that aired Fridays at 8:00-8:30 PM on NBC from September 16 to October 14, 1977.

After six seasons, Redd Foxx left Sanford and Son to star in a variety show for ABC. The producers planned to continue the series with Demond Wilson as Lamont, but Wilson left the project in a dispute over his expected salary as the star of the series. The producers decided to continue the project with a new character. Norman Lear stepped down from his position as executive producer but stayed on as a consultant.

Premise 
The new lead character was Phil Wheeler (Theodore Wilson), a widower and old Army buddy of Fred Sanford. It was explained that Fred and Lamont had moved to Arizona and they sold their property to Phil. Phil now lived in the Sanfords' old house in Los Angeles, with his two teenage children, Angie and Nat. The primary setting of the series, however, was the rooming house next door that Fred named "The Sanford Arms". Fred and Lamont bought the house in the penultimate season of the original series. The new series focused on Phil's attempts to turn the rooming house into a successful hotel.

Most of the recurring characters from the original series also starred in this series. Grady (Whitman Mayo) was now married to his girlfriend Dolly (who appeared in an episode of the original series). Bubba (Don Bexley) now worked at the Sanford Arms as a bellman and a maintenance man. Aunt Esther (LaWanda Page) was left in charge helping Phil and collecting the mortgage payments. Rounding out the cast of characters was Phil's girlfriend, Jeannie.

The attempt to continue a popular series without its two main stars turned out to be a failure. The ratings were low and the show was cancelled after four episodes.  When Redd Foxx returned to television as Fred Sanford in the 1980–1981 short-lived spinoff Sanford, the events of Sanford Arms were completely ignored.

Episodes

Syndication
Sanford Arms was not included in the syndication package with Sanford and Son. Eight episodes had been produced, but the final four episodes did not air before the series' abrupt cancellation. In 1991, BET aired reruns of the series. In 2019, CHCH, a Canadian rerun channel, picked up the series for reruns, airing 6 of the 8 episodes.

References

External links 
 

1977 American television series debuts
1977 American television series endings
1970s American black sitcoms
1970s American sitcoms
English-language television shows
NBC original programming
Sanford & Son spin-offs
American television spin-offs
Television series by Sony Pictures Television
Television shows set in Los Angeles